Tzofit is a moshav in central Israel. Located near Kfar Saba, it falls under the jurisdiction of Drom HaSharon Regional Council.

History
Before the 20th century the area formed part of the Forest of Sharon. It was an open woodland dominated by Mount Tabor Oak, which extended from Kfar Yona in the north to Ra'anana in the south. The local Arab inhabitants traditionally used the area for pasture, firewood and intermittent cultivation. The intensification of settlement and agriculture in the coastal plain during the 19th century led to deforestation and subsequent environmental degradation.

The moshav was founded on land bought by the Jewish National Fund in 1933 on formerly Arab owned lands purchased from residents of Qalqiliya by a 50-strong agricultural gar'in.

References

External links
Official website 

1933 establishments in Mandatory Palestine
Moshavim
Populated places established in 1933
Populated places in Central District (Israel)